Indu Sundaresan is an Indian-American author of historical fiction.

Personal life
She was born and raised in India as the daughter of an Indian Air Force pilot, Group Captain R. Sundaresan, who died in a crash while on duty. Her mother's name is Madhuram Sundaresan. The family then moved to Bangalore, where she collected books eagerly. She then migrated to the United States for graduate studies at the University of Delaware. She has an MS in operations research and an MA in economics. She is married and lives in Seattle, Washington with her husband and daughter.

Career
Her first novel The Twentieth Wife is about how a young widow named Mehrunissa, daughter of Persian refugees and wife of an Afghan commander, becomes Empress of the Mughal Empire under the name of Nur Jahan. 

Her second novel The Feast of Roses is the sequel to The Twentieth Wife and focuses on Nur Jahan exerting authority granted by her husband Jahangir during the sixteen years of her marriage to the emperor.

Shadow Princess is the third novel in the Taj trilogy set after the succession of Shahjahan (Prince Khurram) whose chief queen Mumtaz Mahal dies in childbirth and then their daughter, Jahanara takes centre stage in the politics of the court.

She is also the author of The Splendor of Silence, historical fiction set in a fictional Indian princely state just before Indian independence in 1947. Her work has been translated into some 23 languages worldwide.

Her short fiction has appeared in The Vincent Brothers Review and on iVillage.com.

Awards
 Washington State Book Award for The Twentieth Wife in 2003.
 Light of India award for Excellence in Literature

Works 
Taj Mahal trilogy
 Twentieth Wife (2002)
 The Feast of Roses (2003)
 Shadow Princess (2010)

 Other
 The Splendour of Silence (2006)
 In the Convent of Little Flowers (2008)
 The Mountain of Light (2013)

References

External links
 , essay by the author
 "An Interview with Novelist Indu Sundaresan"  California Literary Review, 3 April 2007.

Living people
Year of birth missing (living people)
21st-century American novelists
American novelists of Indian descent
American women writers of Indian descent
Indian emigrants to the United States
University of Delaware alumni
21st-century American women writers
American women novelists